Oddy is a surname. Notable people with the name include:

Christine Oddy (1955–2014), English politician
John James Oddy, British Conservative Party politician
Michael Oddy, Green Party candidate in the Canadian federal election, 2004
John Oddy, Yorkshire born social worker

See also
Oddi (surname)
Oddie